Alexis Lefebvre (born 21 May 2003) is a French professional footballer who plays as a winger for  club Nancy on loan from Troyes.

Professional career
A youth product of Pacy, Lefebvre signed with Troyes on 4 December 2018. Lefebvre made his professional debut with Troyes in a 1–0 Coupe de France loss to Auxerre on 19 January 2021.

On 31 January 2023, Lefebvre was loaned by Nancy.

References

External links
 

2003 births
Living people
Association football wingers
French footballers
ES Troyes AC players
AS Nancy Lorraine players
Ligue 2 players
Championnat National 3 players